Rodney Brown (born 31 October 1948) is an Australian equestrian. He competed in two events at the 1988 Summer Olympics.

References

External links
 

1948 births
Living people
Australian male equestrians
Olympic equestrians of Australia
Equestrians at the 1988 Summer Olympics
Sportspeople from Melbourne
Sportsmen from Victoria (Australia)